The Single-handed Trans-Atlantic Race (STAR) is an east-to-west yacht race across the North Atlantic. When inaugurated in 1960, it was the first single-handed ocean yacht race; it is run from Plymouth in England to Newport, Rhode Island in the United States, and has generally been held on a four yearly basis.

The race is organised by the Royal Western Yacht Club and was originally sponsored by the UK-based newspaper The Observer, and known as the Observer Single-handed Trans-Atlantic Race; due to changes in sponsorship, it has been known as the CSTAR, Europe 1 STAR, and the Europe 1 New Man STAR. After the 2000 edition, the RWYC took the decision to split the race into two events, one using smaller boats and intended for amateurs and young sailors, the other for professionals. The amateur event was raced as The OSTAR ("Original STAR") from 2005. The professional version was raced as The Transat from 2004.

The 2020 races were canceled due to the COVID-19 pandemic.

History
The Single-handed Trans-Atlantic Race was conceived by Herbert "Blondie" Hasler in 1956. The whole idea of a single-handed ocean yacht race was a revolutionary concept at the time, as the idea was thought to be extremely impractical; but this was especially true given the adverse conditions of their proposed route — a westward crossing of the north Atlantic Ocean, against the prevailing winds.

Hasler sought sponsorship for a race, but by 1959, no-one had been prepared to back the race. Finally, though, The Observer newspaper provided sponsorship, and in 1960, under the management of the Royal Western Yacht Club of England, the Observer Single-handed Trans-Atlantic Race, or OSTAR, was on.

The first run of the race was a great success; since then, it has run every four years, and has become firmly established as one of the major events on the yachting calendar. The name of the event has changed several times due to changes in main sponsor; it has been known as the CSTAR, Europe 1 STAR, and the Europe 1 New Man STAR. The professional event has been run as The Transat from 2004, while the race smaller boats is run as the OSTAR. Throughout its history, however, the essentials of the race have remained the same. It has also become known as a testbed for new innovations in yacht racing; many new ideas started out in "the STAR".

The race

The first edition of the race was from Plymouth United Kingdom to New York City; the editions from 1964 to 2000 were sailed from Plymouth to Newport, Rhode Island; the 2004 event sailed from Plymouth to Boston, Massachusetts.

The actual course steered is the decision of the individual skipper, and the result of the race can hinge on the chosen route:
 Rhumb line
 The shortest route on paper — i.e. on a Mercator projection chart — is a route which steers a constant compass course, known as the rhumb line route; this is 2,902 nautical miles. This lies between 40 degrees and 50 degrees north, and avoids the most severe weather.
 Great circle
This goes significantly farther north; sailors following this route frequently encounter fog and icebergs.
 Northern route
 It is sometimes possible to avoid headwinds by following a far northern route, north of the great circle and above the track followed by depressions.
 Azores route
 A "softer" option can be to sail south, close to the Azores, and across the Atlantic along a more southerly latitude.
 Trade wind route
 The most "natural" way to cross the Atlantic westward is to sail south to the trade winds, and then west across the ocean.

This variety of routes is one of the factors which makes an east-to-west north Atlantic crossing interesting, as different skippers try different strategies against each other. In practice, though, the winning route is usually somewhere between the great circle and the rhumb line.

The OSTAR Edition

The OSTAR, 1960
The Observer Single-handed Trans-Atlantic Race of 1960 was a milestone in sailing, being the first single-handed ocean yacht race. One hundred and fifteen people expressed an interest in the race, and there were eight entries, of whom five actually took part. Only four were at the starting line on June 11, however, as Jean Lacombe arrived late and started three days after the others. All of the boats were monohulls; this was to be the only edition of the race without multihulls. It was also the only edition of the race sailed from Plymouth to New York City.

The skippers tried a variety of routing strategies. Hasler chose the northern route, to avoid the depressions; Chichester and Lewis stayed closer to the great circle; Lacombe and Howells chose more southerly routes. Hasler sailed his junk-rigged Jester; Chichester had by far the longest boat, his  Gipsy Moth III, and this was reflected in the results:

The race had a huge impact on ocean sailing, and in particular solo sailing. Hasler's wind-vane self-steering gear revolutionised short-handed sailing, and his other major innovation — using a junk rig for safer and more manageable shorthanded sailing — influenced many subsequent sailors.

The OSTAR, 1964
Thirteen competitors started the next edition of the race in 1964, which by now was firmly established on the racing scene. All of the five original competitors entered, and all five improved their original times; but the show was stolen by French naval officer Éric Tabarly, who entered a custom-built  plywood ketch, Pen Duick II. The days of racers sailing the family boat were numbered following Tabarly's performance, for which he was awarded the Legion of Honour by president Charles de Gaulle. It is also noteworthy that Tabarly and Jean Lacombe were the only French entrants in this race; Tabarly's success was instrumental in popularising the sport in France, the country which in future years would come to dominate it.

This was to be the year in which several future trends were established. Multihulls made their first appearance — sailing in the same class as the other boats; and the race featured the use of radio, for the first time, by several competitors who gave daily progress reports to their sponsors.

The OSTAR, 1968
The race was by now acquiring a reputation for pushing forward the technology of ocean sailing, and the 1968 edition featured the first use of computer-based weather routing. A far cry from today's laptop-laden yachts, this consisted of a land-based mainframe computer, the English Electric KDF9, linked by radio to Geoffrey Williams in his boat Sir Thomas Lipton. Although outside private routing advice of this kind is no longer permitted in most "unassisted" races, it is now routine for ocean sailors to do similar analyses using their on-board computers to process public weather information.

Williams created another story by his use of the "shortcut" through the Nantucket Shoal. This dangerous route was supposed to be illegal, but due to an error the race instructions required skippers only to keep south of Nantucket, instead of Nantucket Light. Williams successfully navigated the treacherous route in a gale. Gales were a major feature of the race, with a large storm on the 11th of June, and Hurricane Brenda, both contributing to the large number of retired and abandoned boats. One casualty was Éric Tabarly, aboard his new trimaran Pen Duick IV, who collided with a cargo and sailed back to England with structural damage. Another was the first woman to have taken part, the West German Edith Baumann, aboard her 39-foot trimaran "Koala III".

Although won by a monohull, this race saw the multihulls firmly established on the scene. Thirteen of the thirty-five boats entered were multihulls, led by the controversial proa Cheers; many observers felt that a proa was entirely unsuitable for ocean sailing, but she made a fast time along the Azores route.

The 17 non-finishers included Éric Tabarly on Pen Duick IV, and Alex Carozzo of Italy on San Giorgio. Carozzo went on to compete in the Sunday Times Golden Globe Race, the other major single-handed sailing event of the year.

The OSTAR, 1972
Tabarly's trimaran Pen Duick IV made a return to the race in 1972, sailed by Alain Colas, at the head of a strong French contingent; of the 55 entrants, 12 were French, and the top three finishers were all French.

The average boat size was increasing rapidly, as longer boats are capable of higher speeds. A sign of the changing times was that the rules had a minimum size, to deter unsafe entries, but no maximum; and so the star of the monohull fleet was Vendredi Treize (Friday the 13th), a  three-masted schooner — a huge boat for a single-hander. However, the race was now dominated by the multihulls, with Colas winning on a trimaran and four of the top six finishers being multis.

The 55 entrants included the first female finishers, two French and one Polish. Sir Francis Chichester, now 70 years old, sailed with the fleet in Gipsy Moth V; however, he was unable to complete what was to be his last race, and he died later the same year. Peter Crowther made the longest crossing in the race's history while sailing the oldest boat, the 66-year-old gaff cutter Golden Vanity; his crossing took 88 days.

The top ten finishers:

There were eleven retirements, and one boat was abandoned.

The OSTAR, 1976
1976 saw the biggest edition of the race, in all senses. 125 boats entered, and the  Vendredi Treize returned as ITT Oceanic. However, the all-time size record for the race, and probably for any single-hander, was set by Alain Colas, sailing the  four-masted schooner Club Mediterranée. Although about the same overall length as HMS Victory (which had a crew of 820), this modern boat was expressly designed for easy handling.

At the start of the race, during login, in it was discovered that one of the entrants, David Sandeman, was under age at 17 years and 176 days, which was 189 days or 6 months under the youngest age permitted at the time. He had entered "Sea Raider", a 35 ft monohull which had very carefully been equipped and prepared in Jersey, Channel Islands for this race. David was not allowed to officially start, but he crossed the line unofficially after the last boat had left. Halfway across the Atlantic a Russian trawler ran into him in the dark during a storm after being warned with a red spotlight. The Russian crew never saw him, but their ship damaged the starboard mast halyards, which required substantial work by the Russian crew to repair the boat sufficiently to allow it to continue. David Sandeman was later listed in the Guinness Book of Records as being the youngest person to single-handedly sail the Atlantic between Jersey, UK, and Rhode Island.

Monohulls and multihulls were not segregated. It is notable that the second-placed boat overall was a trimaran of the smallest class, and perhaps even more so that third place went to a monohull from the same class.

Two major depressions hit the race and caused a record fifty retirements. Yvon Fauconnier and Jean-Yves Terlain, two of the top favorites, lost their boats due to structural failure and were rescued by the same Soviet cargo ship. Tony Bullimore was rescued by a passing ship after his boat caught fire. The race also suffered two fatalities, the first in its history. Englishman Mike Flanagan, brother of renowned sculptor Barry Flanagan, was lost overboard from Galloping Gael. A particularly sad story was that of Mike McMullen, whose wife Lizzie was electrocuted and killed while helping him to prepare Three Cheers for the race, just two days before the start. Believing that Lizzie would have wanted him to go on, he started the race, but was never seen again.

Colas in Club Mediterranée was plagued by halyard problems; although  in the lead, he was forced to pull into Halifax, Nova Scotia to make repairs, and was penalised 10% of his elapsed time (58 hours) for accepting help, which dropped him from second to fifth place. The race went to Éric Tabarly, whose surprise win on the  Pen Duick VI (his radio had broken down and no one knew of his whereabouts until he crossed the finish line) was his second; it was also the last win for a monohull.

Clare Francis in Robertson's Golly (Ohlson 38) finished 13th and broke the women's single-handed transatlantic record by three days.

The top finishers (including the top three of each class):

The 1/OSTAR, 1980
The 1980 race introduced a length limit of 56 feet overall, to curb the excesses of previous races. The new restrictions were unpopular with some sailors, particularly the French, many of whom opted to sail instead in the new Route du Rhum race.

The race was once again dominated by multihulls, with the top five places all taken by trimarans, and marked the end of even competition between monos and multis. Éric Tabarly was to compete, aboard the hydrofoil trimaran Paul Ricard, but was unable to enter due to injury. The race continued its history of innovation with the first use of the Argos satellite-based tracking system; this system allows boats to be tracked during the race, and can also be used to signal distress. The use of this system has now become a major feature of many ocean races, such as the Vendée Globe. The cost of the system was covered by introducing a new race sponsor, the radio station Europe 1, in conjunction with the Observer.

The winner was American Phil Weld, in only his second OSTAR, whose trimaran Moxie was custom built to the  limit; he set a new course record of 18 days. Many were impressed by this popular sailor's win at the age of 65. The preponderance of larger boats, and particularly multihulls, left the smaller Jesters seriously outclassed; the highest-placed was Free Newspapers, sailed by John Chaundy, who finished in 29th place, with a time of 28 days., RWYC OSTAR Race Results   -   1980

Dame Naomi James, who became the second lady to circumnavigate the globe single-handedly in 1977/78 was reunited with the Express Crusader (fitted out and renamed Kriter Lady) for the race. She was the first woman back and broke the women's speed record. Her husband Rob James also competed in that race, finishing twelfth in the trimaran Boatfile.

Canadian skippers Mike Birch and Bob Lush were the subject of a National Film Board of Canada documentary Singlehanders, released in 1982.

The 1/OSTAR, 1984
The 1984 race saw the pace of technical innovation continue to accelerate. Custom-built trimarans were again the main force, but the monohulls also advanced, with the introduction of water ballast and other innovations. Some controversy over the size limitations in the previous race resulted in slightly larger classes, and the removal of restrictions on bow and stern overhangs; yachts were divided into five classes, but still with no distinction between monohulls and multihulls. Europe 1 continued to support the race, and Argos beacons were again used by all boats.

The first day of the race saw several dismastings in strong gales, and several skippers were awarded time for rescuing other racers. This resulted in an upset at the finish — Philippe Poupon, sailing the  trimaran Fleury Michon VI, arrived first with a time of 16 days 12 hours, and went to bed thinking that he had won. But the race was awarded to Yvon Fauconnier, who finished 10 hours later but was given a 16-hour time allowance for rendering assistance to Philippe Jeantot, whose catamaran Credit Agricole had capsized. The winner among the monohulls was Warren Luhrs, in his 60-footer Thursday's Child.

The CSTAR, 1988
With Carlsberg taking over as main sponsor, the Carlsberg Single-handed Trans-Atlantic Race of 1988 saw 95 entrants, with custom-built multihulls again dominating. Favourable weather made ideal conditions for a fast pace, and indeed Philippe Poupon's winning time set a new race record of 10 days, 9 hours and 10 minutes. One of the main hazards of the race was damage by whales; Mike Birch's Fujicolor was damaged by a whale, forcing him to retire from the race; and David Sellings was forced to abandon Hyccup after she was sunk by an aggressive pod of whales. Mike Richey's original Jester, which had taken part in every edition of the race, was lost in heavy weather in the tail-end of the fleet.

The top eleven finishers were all Class 1 multihulls. The top five were:

The fastest monohull, UAP 1992, finished 13th. The top five monohulls:

The Europe 1 STAR, 1992
The Europe 1 Star of 1992 saw the fleet beset by a full range of hazards — storms, icebergs, trawlers, fog and whales hit boats on the northern route, before they were finally becalmed off Newfoundland. The monohulls managed the heavy conditions and crosswinds quite well, but the multis were plagued with capsizes and damage. Yves Parlier was the top monohull skipper in a new Open 60, setting a monohull record time of 14 days 16 hours.

The top ten finishers included two monohulls:

The Europe 1 STAR, 1996

Peyron's time of 10 days, 10 hours and 5 minutes, was just 50 minutes short of the course record. Peyron was the first person to win two successive editions of the race, and only the second to win twice. Gerry Roufs won the monohull division, sailing the  Groupe LG2. Italian Giovanni Soldini won the  monohull class, in Telecom Italia.

Only three multihulls overcame the conditions to make the top ten finishers:

The Europe 1 New Man STAR, 2000
With sponsorship from Europe 1 and New Man, a French sportswear manufacturer, the fortieth anniversary edition of the OSTAR was run under the title Europe 1 New Man STAR.

A surprising total of 24 Open 60 monohulls entered the race; most of these were using the event as a qualifying run for the 2000-2001 Vendée Globe starting later in the year. One of these was the youngest racer in the fleet at age 23, Ellen MacArthur in her new Owen-Clarke designed Open 60 Kingfisher; she beat the big names to become the surprise winner of the monohull division, and the youngest ever winner of the race. The overall winner was Francis Joyon, in his trimaran Eure et Loir.

Faraday Mill OSTAR 2005
The 2005 event was the first held for smaller boats, again under the name OSTAR, sponsored by Faraday Mill.

35 boats took part with 16 forced to retire. Franco Manzoli won the race in Cotonella, taking 17 days and 21 hours to finish. The 2005 race featured the first single-handed, trans-atlantic crossing by a profoundly deaf person: Gerry Hughes.

OSTAR 2009
The 2009 OSTAR started on 25 May 2009. The skipper's blogs were published on www.blogstar.org.uk

OSTAR 2013
The 2013 OSTAR started on 27 May 2013.

OSTAR 2017

OSTAR 2021

The English Transat
After the 2000 event, the RWYC decided to split the race into two separate events. So in 2004 professional edition of the race featured a new title The Transat —

The Transat, 2004
The 2004 professional edition of the race featured a new title — The Transat — and a new finish, at Boston, Massachusetts. 37 boats entered, in four classes: ORMA 50 and  multihulls; and IMOCA 50 and  monohulls. Despite stormy conditions, all four classes of boats broke records; seven of the Open 60 monohulls broke the previous monohull record. Of the first four IMOCA Open 60's, Ecover, Pindar AlphaGraphics and Skandia (ex Kingfisher) were all designed by the British designers, Owen Clarke Design. This office also designed the first IMOCA 50, Artforms, which broke the 'Class 2' record. Several boats suffered damage, however.

The Artemis Transat, 2008
The 2008 Transat race was named after its sponsor, Artemis. On Thursday 15 May, Frenchman Michel Desjoyeaux (Foncia) had to retire from the race after a collision with a whale. Sebastien Josse (BT), who was leading, had to retire owing to damage to the mainsail carriage on Saturday 17 May, leaving Vincent Riou (PRB) take the lead on the Sunday morning. Loïck Peyron, on Gitana Eighty, caught up with Vincent Riou, who had to abandon the race due to serious keel damage after a collision with a basking shark on the night of Monday 12 / Tuesday 13 May. The race jury decided to grant two and a half hours of bonus time to Loïck Peyron after he rescued Vincent Riou. Starting on 11 May from Plymouth, Peyron spent 12 days, 11 hours, 15 minutes and 35 seconds (not including the time bonus) to cover the 2,992 miles of the race (averaging 8.7 knots), thus improving previous record of 12 days, 15 hours, 18 minutes and 8 seconds, which was held by Mike Golding (Ecover).

The Transat Bakerly 2016

The Transat CIC 2020 
Cancelled due to COVID 19.

The Transat CIC 2021

References

Transat Website
OSTAR Website

Recurring events established in 1960
Single-handed sailing competitions
Yachting races
Sailing competitions in the United Kingdom
Sailing competitions in the United States
Transatlantic sailing competitions